Reginald Otto Lissaman (April 24, 1908 in Brandon, Manitoba – August 14, 1974) was a politician in Manitoba, Canada.  He was a member of the Legislative Assembly of Manitoba from 1952 to 1969, sitting as a member of the Progressive Conservative Party.

The son of Frank C. Lissaman, Lissaman was educated in Brandon and Chicago, Illinois.  He worked as a building contractor, was a director on the Manitoba Hydro Board and sat on the Board of Directors for Brandon College.

He was first elected to the Manitoba legislature in a 1952 by-election, scoring a fairly easy victory in the riding of Brandon City.  In the 1953 general election, he was re-elected over Liberal-Progressive James Creighton by 451 votes.  The Liberal-Progressives were in government during this period, and Lissaman sat as a member of the opposition.  In 1953-54, he campaigned for the removal of Errick Willis as Progressive Conservative leader.

The PCs won the 1958 election, and Lissaman was handily re-elected in the renamed Brandon riding.  He won further easy victories in the elections of 1959 and 1962.  In the 1966 election, he was only narrowly re-elected over Liberal Terry Penton.

Lissaman, to the surprise of many, was never appointed to cabinet.  He did not seek re-election in 1969.

He helped develop the International Peace Garden located on the border between North Dakota and Manitoba.

References 

1908 births
1974 deaths
Progressive Conservative Party of Manitoba MLAs
Canadian people of German descent
Politicians from Brandon, Manitoba